The Sadat Democratic Party is a political party in Egypt. The party supported Abdel Fattah el-Sisi in the 2014 Egyptian presidential election.

References

Political parties in Egypt